Midan Ghazal  is a Syrian village located in the Qalaat al-Madiq Subdistrict in the al-Suqaylabiyah District in Hama Governorate. According to the Syria Central Bureau of Statistics (CBS), Midan Ghazal had a population of 631 in the 2004 census. Its inhabitants are predominantly Sunni Muslims.

References

Populated places in al-Suqaylabiyah District
Populated places in Jabal Zawiya